South Carolina Highway 460 (SC 460) is a  primary state highway in the U.S. state of South Carolina. It serves as an bypass of SC 160, from Tega Cay to east of Fort Mill.

Route description

SC 460 begins at the intersection SC 160 and Gold Hill Road, in Tega Cay. Traveling east, along Gold Hill Road, it connects with Interstate 77 (I-77), then soon after splits from Gold Hill Road at Deerfield Drive intersection, continuing as Springfield Parkway. Connecting with U.S. Route 21 (US 21), it begins a concurrency with SC 160 Truck, followed by a quick concurrency with US 21 Business. Reaching back with SC 160, on the eastern side of Fort Mill, the highway ends with SC 160 Truck.

The Gold Hill Road segment is four-lane with turning median; it is also known as the Becky Meacham-Richardson Highway, who served as a state representative for the Lake Wylie–Tega Cay area. The Springfield Parkway segment is two-lane with semi-controlled access.

History
SC 460 appeared around 2012 as a new primary route, following existing Gold Hill Road and Springfield Parkway.

Major intersections

See also

References

External links

SC 460 at Mapmikey's South Carolina Highways Page at the Virginia Highways Annex

460
Transportation in York County, South Carolina
Fort Mill, South Carolina